The Summer Tour was a concert tour in 2006 by American R&B singer Erykah Badu. The tour started on June 10, in Knoxville, Tennessee with three shows in North America and several shows through the summer in Europe and a second outing in North America. Badu co-headlined dates in August with Jill Scott and Queen Latifah for their "Sugar Water Tour".

Set list
"Band Jam Intro"
"Your My"
"Suga"/"Kiss Me On My Neck"
"I Want You"
"Cleva"
"Back in the Day (Puff)" 1
"Black Ghost" 
"Other Side of the Game"
"Danger"
"On & On" / "...& On"
"Penitentiary Philosophy"
"Orange Moon" 1
"Didn't Cha Know?"
"Green Eyes"
"Love of My Life (An Ode to Hip-Hop)" (contain elements of "Rapper's Delight" and "Gangsta Gangsta")
"Tyrone"
"Bag Lady"

1 performed only at select dates in North America and Europe.

Band
Director/Keyboards: R.C. Williams
Percussion: James Clemons
Bass: Braylon Lacy
Flute: Dwayne Kerr
Drums: Christopher Dave
DJ: Burtron Smith
VJ: Kerwin Detracy Devonish
Background vocals: Eugenia Bess, Keisha Jackson

Tour dates

Concerts and other miscellaneous performances
This concert was a part of Dave Chappelle's Block Party in 2006 at Oven Auditorium in Charlotte, North Carolina.
This concert was a part of "The Roots & Friends" at Radio City Music Hall in New York City.

References

Erykah Badu concert tours
2006 concert tours